German submarine U-582 was a Type VIIC U-boat of Nazi Germany's Kriegsmarine during World War II.

The boat was sunk by depth charges from a US aircraft, southwest of Iceland on 5 October 1942.

Design
German Type VIIC submarines were preceded by the shorter Type VIIB submarines. U-582 had a displacement of  when at the surface and  while submerged. She had two shafts and two  propellers.

U-582 was fitted with five  torpedo tubes (four fitted at the bow and one at the stern), fourteen torpedoes, one  SK C/35 naval gun, 220 rounds, and a  C/30 anti-aircraft gun. The boat had a complement of between forty-four and sixty.

Service history
The submarine was laid down on 25 September 1940 at Blohm & Voss, Hamburg as yard number 558, launched on 12 June 1941 and commissioned on 7 August under the command of Korvettenkapitän Werner Schulte.

She served with the 5th U-boat Flotilla from 7 August 1941 for training and the 1st U-boat Flotilla for operations until her loss, from 1 January until 5 October 1942.

First patrol
U-582s first patrol was preceded by a diversion to Trondheim in Norway to replace the stud bolts of her exhaust valves. She left the Nordic port on 3 January 1942 and headed for the Atlantic Ocean via the gap separating the Faroe and Shetland Islands. A lookout broke an arm in bad weather on the tenth, but she sank the Refast on the 26th off St. Johns.

She arrived at Brest in occupied France, on 7 February.

Second patrol
Her second foray took her to the US east coast, but the pickings were thin, she returned to Brest on 24 May 1942 without any successes.

Third patrol
The ship had been carrying ammunition and depth charges as well as HMNZS ML-1090, a 46-tons patrol craft being taken from Britain to New Zealand as deck cargo. Debris from the exploding ship was found on the U-boat's casing.

She also sank the Empire Attendant a few days later (15 July) southwest of the Canary Islands.

The U-boat had fired two torpedoes and 161 rounds from her deck gun but she remained afloat. The master and chief engineer were taken prisoner; the ship sank by the stern.

Fourth patrol and loss
The submarine left Brest for the last time on 14 September 1942.

She was sunk on 5 October 1942 by depth charges dropped by a US PBY Catalina from VP-73 southwest of Iceland.

Forty-six men died with U-582; there were no survivors.

Previously recorded fate
U-582 was sunk on 5 October 1942 by a British Lockheed Hudson of No. 269 Squadron RAF. It was later ascertained that this attack sank the sub was sunk by Catalina pby-5a with bu no 2459, owned by a Dutch group of aviation enthousiasts.

Wolfpacks
U-582 took part in five wolfpacks, namely:
 Zieten (15 – 22 January 1942)
 Hai (3 – 21 July 1942)
 Blitz (22 – 26 September 1942)
 Tiger (26 – 30 September 1942)
 Luchs (1 – 5 October 1942)

Summary of raiding history

References

Notes

Citations

Bibliography

External links

German Type VIIC submarines
U-boats commissioned in 1941
U-boats sunk in 1942
U-boats sunk by US aircraft
U-boats sunk by depth charges
1941 ships
Ships built in Hamburg
Ships lost with all hands
World War II submarines of Germany
World War II shipwrecks in the Atlantic Ocean
Maritime incidents in October 1942